Nancy Davis Reagan (born Anne Frances Robbins; July 6, 1921 – March 6, 2016) was an American film actress and the first lady of the United States from 1981 to 1989 as the second wife of president Ronald Reagan.

Reagan was born in New York City. After her parents separated, she lived in Maryland with an aunt and uncle for six years. When her mother remarried in 1929, she moved to Chicago and later was adopted by her mother's second husband. As Nancy Davis, she was a Hollywood actress in the 1940s and 1950s, starring in films such as The Next Voice You Hear..., Night into Morning, and Donovan's Brain. In 1952, she married Ronald Reagan, who was then president of the Screen Actors Guild. He had two children from his previous marriage to Jane Wyman and he and Nancy had two children together. Nancy Reagan was the first lady of California when her husband was governor from 1967 to 1975, and she began to work with the Foster Grandparents Program.

Reagan became First Lady of the United States in January 1981, following her husband's victory in the 1980 presidential election. Early in his first term, she was criticized largely due to her decision to replace the White House china, which had been paid for by private donations, and for accepting free clothing from fashion designers. She championed causes opposed to recreational drug use when she founded the "Just Say No" drug awareness campaign, which was considered her major initiative as First Lady. More discussion of her role ensued following a 1988 revelation that she had consulted an astrologer to assist in planning the president's schedule after the attempted assassination of her husband in 1981. She generally had a strong influence on her husband and played a role in a few of his personnel and diplomatic decisions.

After Ronald Reagan's term as president ended, the couple returned to their home in Bel Air, Los Angeles, California. Nancy devoted most of her time to caring for her husband, who was diagnosed with Alzheimer's disease in 1994, until his death at the age of 93 on June 5, 2004. Reagan remained active within the Reagan Library and in politics, particularly in support of embryonic stem cell research, until her death from congestive heart failure at age 94 in 2016.

Early life and education 

Anne Frances Robbins was born on July 6, 1921, at Sloane Hospital for Women in Uptown Manhattan. Davis gave her birth date as July 6, 1923, a date cited through most of her life. She was of English descent. She was the only child of Kenneth Seymour Robbins (1892–1972), a farmer turned car salesman who had been born into a once-prosperous family, and his actress wife, Edith Prescott Luckett (1888–1987). Her godmother was silent-film-star Alla Nazimova. From birth, she was commonly called Nancy.

Robbins lived her first two years in Flushing, Queens, a neighborhood of New York City, in a two-story house on Roosevelt Avenue between 149th and 150th Streets. Her parents separated soon after her birth and were divorced in 1928. After their separation, her mother traveled the country to pursue acting jobs and Robbins was raised in Bethesda, Maryland, for six years by her aunt, Virginia Luckett, and uncle, Audley Gailbraith, where she attended Sidwell Friends School for kindergarten through second grade. Nancy later described longing for her mother during those years: "My favorite times were when Mother had a job in New York, and Aunt Virgie would take me by train to stay with her."

In 1929, her mother married Loyal Edward Davis (1896–1982), a prominent conservative neurosurgeon who moved the family to Chicago. Nancy and her stepfather got along very well; she later wrote that he was "a man of great integrity who exemplified old-fashioned values". He formally adopted her in 1938, and she would always refer to him as her father. At the time of the adoption, her name was legally changed to Nancy Davis. She attended the Girls' Latin School of Chicago (describing herself as an average student), from 1929, until she graduated in 1939, and later attended Smith College in Massachusetts, where she majored in English and drama, graduating in 1943.

Acting career 

In 1940, a young Davis had appeared as a National Foundation for Infantile Paralysis volunteer in a memorable short subject film shown in movie theaters to raise donations for the crusade against polio. The Crippler featured a sinister figure spreading over playgrounds and farms, laughing over its victims, until finally dispelled by the volunteer. It was very effective in raising contributions.

Following her graduation from college, Davis held jobs in Chicago as a sales clerk in Marshall Field's department store and as a nurse's aide. With the help of her mother's colleagues in theatre, including ZaSu Pitts, Walter Huston, and Spencer Tracy, she pursued a professional career as an actress. She first gained a part in Pitts' 1945 road tour of Ramshackle Inn, moving to New York City. She landed the role of Si-Tchun, a lady-in-waiting, in the 1946 Broadway musical about the Orient, Lute Song, starring Mary Martin and a pre-fame Yul Brynner. The show's producer told her, "You look like you could be Chinese."

After passing a screen test, she moved to California and signed a seven-year contract with Metro-Goldwyn-Mayer Studios Inc. (MGM) in 1949; she later remarked, "Joining Metro was like walking into a dream world." Her combination of attractive appearance—centered on her large eyes—and somewhat distant and understated manner made her hard at first for MGM to cast and publicize. Davis appeared in eleven feature films, usually typecast as a "loyal housewife", "responsible young mother", or "the steady woman". Jane Powell, Debbie Reynolds, Leslie Caron, and Janet Leigh were among the actresses with whom she competed for roles at MGM.

Davis' film career began with small supporting roles in two films that were released in 1949, The Doctor and the Girl with Glenn Ford and East Side, West Side starring Barbara Stanwyck. She played a child psychiatrist in the film noir Shadow on the Wall (1950) with Ann Sothern and Zachary Scott; her performance was called "beautiful and convincing" by New York Times critic A. H. Weiler. She co-starred in 1950's The Next Voice You Hear..., playing a pregnant housewife who hears the voice of God from her radio. Influential reviewer Bosley Crowther of The New York Times wrote that "Nancy Davis [is] delightful as [a] gentle, plain, and understanding wife." In 1951, Davis appeared in Night into Morning, her favorite screen role, a study of bereavement starring Ray Milland. Crowther said that Davis "does nicely as the fiancée who is widowed herself and knows the loneliness of grief", while another noted critic, The Washington Post's Richard L. Coe, said Davis "is splendid as the understanding widow". MGM released Davis from her contract in 1952; she sought a broader range of parts, but also married Reagan, keeping her professional name as Davis, and had her first child that year. She soon starred in the science fiction film Donovan's Brain (1953); Crowther said that Davis, playing the role of a possessed scientist's "sadly baffled wife", "walked through it all in stark confusion" in an "utterly silly" film. In her next-to-last movie, Hellcats of the Navy (1957), she played nurse Lieutenant Helen Blair, and appeared in a film for the only time with her husband, playing what one critic called "a housewife who came along for the ride". Another reviewer, however, stated that Davis plays her part satisfactorily, and "does well with what she has to work with".

Author Garry Wills has said that Davis was generally underrated as an actress because her constrained part in Hellcats was her most widely seen performance. In addition, Davis downplayed her Hollywood goals: promotional material from MGM in 1949 said that her "greatest ambition" was to have a "successful happy marriage"; decades later, in 1975, she would say, "I was never really a career woman but [became one] only because I hadn't found the man I wanted to marry. I couldn't sit around and do nothing, so I became an actress." Ronald Reagan biographer Lou Cannon nevertheless characterized her as a "reliable" and "solid" performer who held her own in performances with better-known actors. After her final film, Crash Landing (1958), Davis appeared for a brief time as a guest star in television dramas, such as the Zane Grey Theatre episode "The Long Shadow" (1961), where she played opposite Ronald Reagan, as well as Wagon Train and The Tall Man, until she retired as an actress in 1962.

During her career, Davis served for nearly ten years on the board of directors of the Screen Actors Guild. Decades later, Albert Brooks attempted to coax her out of acting retirement by offering her the title role opposite himself in his 1996 film Mother. She declined in order to care for her husband, and Debbie Reynolds played the part.

Marriage and family 

During her Hollywood career, Davis dated many actors, including Clark Gable, Robert Stack, and Peter Lawford; she later called Gable the nicest of the stars she had met. On November 15, 1949, she met Ronald Reagan, who was then president of the Screen Actors Guild. She had noticed that her name had appeared on the Hollywood blacklist. Davis sought Reagan's help to maintain her employment as a guild actress in Hollywood and for assistance in having her name removed from the list. Ronald Reagan informed her that she had been confused with another actress of the same name. The two began dating and their relationship was the subject of many gossip columns; one Hollywood press account described their nightclub-free times together as "the romance of a couple who have no vices". Ronald Reagan was skeptical about marriage, however, following his painful 1949 divorce from Jane Wyman, and he still saw other women.

After three years of dating, they eventually decided to marry while discussing the issue in the couple's favorite booth at Chasen's, a restaurant in Beverly Hills. The couple wed on March 4, 1952, at the Little Brown Church in the San Fernando Valley of Los Angeles, in a simple and hastily arranged ceremony designed to avoid the press; the marriage was her first and his second. The only people in attendance were fellow actor William Holden (the best man) and his wife, actress Brenda Marshall (the matron of honor). Nancy was likely already pregnant during the ceremony; the couple's first child, Patricia Ann Reagan (later better known by her professional name, Patti Davis), was born less than eight months later on October 21, 1952. Their son, Ronald Prescott Reagan (later better known as Ron Reagan) was born six years later on May 20, 1958. Reagan also became stepmother to Maureen Reagan (1941–2001) and Michael Reagan (b. 1945), her husband's children from his first marriage to Jane Wyman.

Observers described Nancy and Ronald's relationship as intimate. As president and first lady, the Reagans were reported to display their affection frequently, with one press secretary noting, "They never took each other for granted. They never stopped courting." Ronald often called Nancy "Mommy"; she called him "Ronnie". While the president was recuperating in the hospital after the 1981 assassination attempt, Nancy wrote in her diary, "Nothing can happen to my Ronnie. My life would be over." In a letter to Nancy, Ronald wrote, "whatever I treasure and enjoy ... all would be without meaning if I didn't have you." In 1998, a few years after her husband had been given a diagnosis of Alzheimer's disease, Nancy told Vanity Fair, "Our relationship is very special. We were very much in love and still are. When I say my life began with Ronnie, well, it's true. It did. I can't imagine life without him." Nancy was known for the focused and attentive look, termed "the Gaze", that she fastened upon her husband during his speeches and appearances.

President Reagan's death in June 2004 ended what Charlton Heston called "the greatest love affair in the history of the American Presidency".

Nancy's relationship with her children was not always as close as the bond with her husband. She frequently quarreled with her children and her stepchildren. Her relationship with Patti was the most contentious; Patti flouted American conservatism, rebelled against her parents by joining the nuclear freeze movement, and authored many anti-Reagan books. The nearly 20 years of family feuding left Patti very much estranged from both her mother and father. Soon after her father's Alzheimer's disease was diagnosed, Patti and her mother reconciled and began to speak on a daily basis. Nancy's disagreements with Michael were also public matters; in 1984, she was quoted as saying that the two were in an "estrangement right now". Michael responded that Nancy was trying to cover up for the fact she had not met his daughter, Ashley, who had been born nearly a year earlier. They too eventually made peace. Nancy was thought to be closest to her stepdaughter Maureen during the White House years, but each of the Reagan children experienced periods of estrangement from their parents.

First Lady of California (1967–1975) 

Nancy Reagan was First Lady of California during her husband's two terms as governor. She disliked living in the state capital of Sacramento, which lacked the excitement, social life, and mild climate to which she was accustomed in Los Angeles. She first attracted controversy early in 1967; after four months' residence in the California Governor's Mansion in Sacramento, she moved her family into a wealthy suburb because fire officials had labelled the mansion as a "firetrap". Though the Reagans had leased the new house at their expense, the move was viewed as snobbish when the matter was brought to the attention of the general public. Reagan defended her actions as being for the good of her family, a judgment with which her husband readily agreed. Friends of the family later helped support the cost of the leased house, while Reagan supervised construction of a new ranch-style governor's residence in nearby Carmichael. The new residence was finished just as Ronald Reagan left office in 1975, but his successor, Jerry Brown, refused to live there. It was sold in 1982, and California governors lived in improvised arrangements until Brown moved into the Governor's Mansion in 2015.

In 1967, Governor Reagan appointed his wife to the California Arts Commission, and a year later she was named Los Angeles Times Woman of the Year; in its profile, the Times labeled her "A Model First Lady". Her glamour, style, and youthfulness,
made her a frequent subject for press photographers. As first lady, Reagan visited veterans, the elderly, and the handicapped, and worked with a number of charities. She became involved with the Foster Grandparents Program, helping to popularize it in the United States and Australia. She later expanded her work with the organization after arriving in Washington, and wrote about her experiences in her 1982 book To Love a Child. The Reagans held dinners for former POWs and Vietnam War veterans while governor and first lady.

Role in 1976 and 1980 presidential campaigns 

Governor Reagan's gubernatorial time in office ended in 1975, and he did not run for a third term; instead, he met with advisors to discuss a possible bid for the 1976 presidency, challenging incumbent President Gerald Ford. Ronald still needed to convince a reluctant Nancy before running, however. She feared for her husband's health and his career as a whole, though she felt that he was the right man for the job and eventually approved. Nancy took on a traditional role in the campaign, holding coffees, luncheons, and talks. She also oversaw personnel, monitored her husband's schedule, and occasionally provided press conferences. The 1976 campaign included the so-called "battle of the queens", contrasting Nancy with First Lady Betty Ford. They both spoke out over the course of the campaign on similar issues, but with different approaches. Nancy was upset by the warmonger image that the Ford campaign had drawn of her husband.

Though he lost the 1976 Republican nomination, Ronald Reagan ran for the presidency a second time in 1980. He succeeded in winning the nomination and defeated incumbent rival Jimmy Carter in a landslide. During this second campaign, Nancy played a prominent role, and her management of staff became more apparent. She organized a meeting among feuding campaign managers John Sears and Michael Deaver and her husband, which resulted in Deaver leaving the campaign and Sears being given full control. After the Reagan camp lost the Iowa Caucus and fell behind in New Hampshire polls, Nancy organized a second meeting and decided it was time to fire Sears and his associates; she gave Sears a copy of the press release announcing his dismissal. Her influence on her husband became particularly notable; her presence at rallies, luncheons, and receptions increased his confidence.

First Lady of the United States (1981–1989)

White House glamour

Renovation 

Reagan became the first lady of the United States when Ronald Reagan was inaugurated as president in January 1981. Early in her husband's presidency, Reagan stated her desire to create a more suitable "first home" in the White House, as the building had fallen into a state of disrepair following years of neglect. White House aide Michael Deaver described the second and third floor family residence as having "cracked plaster walls, chipped paint [and] beaten up floors"; rather than use government funds to renovate and redecorate, she sought private donations. In 1981, Reagan directed a major renovation of several White House rooms, including all of the second and third floors and rooms adjacent to the Oval Office, including the press briefing room. The renovation included repainting walls, refinishing floors, repairing fireplaces, and replacing antique pipes, windows, and wires. The closet in the master bedroom was converted into a beauty parlor and dressing room, and the West bedroom was made into a small gymnasium.

The first lady secured the assistance of renowned interior designer Ted Graber, popular with affluent West Coast social figures, to redecorate the family living quarters. A Chinese-pattern, handpainted wallpaper was added to the master bedroom. Family furniture was placed in the president's private study. The first lady and her designer retrieved a number of White House antiques, which had been in storage, and placed them throughout the mansion. In addition, many of Reagan's own collectibles were put out for display, including around twenty-five Limoges Boxes, as well as some porcelain eggs and a collection of plates.

The extensive redecoration was paid for by private donations. Many significant and long-lasting changes occurred as a result of the renovation and refurbishment, of which Reagan said, "This house belongs to all Americans, and I want it to be something of which they can be proud." The renovations received some criticisms for being funded by tax-deductible donations, meaning some of it eventually did indirectly come from the tax-paying public.

Fashion 
Reagan's interest in fashion was another one of her trademarks. While her husband was still president-elect, press reports speculated about Reagan's social life and interest in fashion. In many press accounts, Reagan's sense of style was favorably compared to that of a previous first lady, Jacqueline Kennedy. Friends and those close to her remarked that, while fashionable like Kennedy, she would be different from other first ladies; close friend Harriet Deutsch was quoted as saying, "Nancy has her own imprint."

White House photographer Mary Anne Fackelman-Miner, who was assigned to Reagan, said of her, "She always photographed so easily and was at ease in front of the cameras."

Reagan's wardrobe consisted of dresses, gowns, and suits made by luxury designers, including James Galanos, Bill Blass, and Oscar de la Renta. Her white, hand-beaded, one shoulder Galanos 1981 inaugural gown was estimated to cost $10,000, while the overall price of her inaugural wardrobe was said to cost $25,000. She favored the color red, calling it "a picker-upper", and wore it accordingly. Her wardrobe included red so often that the fire-engine shade became known as "Reagan red". She employed two private hairdressers, who would style her hair on a regular basis in the White House.

Fashion designers were pleased with the emphasis Reagan placed on clothing. Adolfo said the first lady embodied an "elegant, affluent, well-bred, chic American look", while Bill Blass commented, "I don't think there's been anyone in the White House since Jacqueline Kennedy Onassis who has her flair." William Fine, president of cosmetic company Frances Denney, noted that she "stays in style, but she doesn't become trendy."

Though her elegant fashions and wardrobe were hailed as a "glamorous paragon of chic", they were also controversial subjects. In 1982, she revealed that she had accepted thousands of dollars in clothing, jewelry, and other gifts, but defended her actions by stating that she had borrowed the clothes, and that they would either be returned or donated to museums, and that she was promoting the American fashion industry. Facing criticism, she soon said she would no longer accept such loans. While often buying her clothes, she continued to borrow and sometimes keep designer clothes throughout her time as first lady, which came to light in 1988. None of this had been included on financial disclosure forms; the non-reporting of loans under $10,000 in liability was in violation of a voluntary agreement the White House had made in 1982, while not reporting more valuable loans or clothes not returned was a possible violation of the Ethics in Government Act. Reagan expressed through her press secretary "regrets that she failed to heed counsel's advice" on disclosing them.

Despite the controversy, many designers who allowed her to borrow clothing, noted that the arrangement was good for their businesses, as well as for the American fashion industry overall. In 1989, Reagan was honored at the annual gala awards dinner of the Council of Fashion Designers of America, during which she received the council's lifetime achievement award. Barbara Walters said of her, "She has served every day for eight long years the word 'style.'"

Extravagance 
Approximately a year into her husband's first term, Nancy explored the idea of ordering new state china service for the White House. A full china service had not been purchased since the Truman administration in the 1940s, as only a partial service was ordered in the Johnson administration. She was quoted as saying, "The White House really badly, badly needs china." Working with Lenox, the primary porcelain manufacturer in America, the first lady chose a design scheme of a red with etched gold band, bordering the scarlet and cream colored ivory plates with a raised presidential seal etched in gold in the center. The full service comprised 4,370 pieces, with 19 pieces per individual set. The service totaled $209,508. Although it was paid for by private donations, some from the private J. P. Knapp Foundation, the purchase generated quite a controversy, for it was ordered at a time when the nation was undergoing an economic recession. Furthermore, news of the china purchase emerged at the same time that her husband's administration had proposed school lunch regulations that would allow ketchup to be counted as a vegetable.

The new china, White House renovations, expensive clothing, and her attendance at the wedding of Charles and Diana, Prince and Princess of Wales, gave her an aura of being "out of touch" with the American people during the recession. This built upon the reputation she had coming to Washington, wherein many people concluded that Reagan was a vain and shallow woman, and her taste for splendor inspired the derogatory nickname "Queen Nancy". While Jacqueline Kennedy had also faced some press criticism for her spending habits, Reagan's treatment was much more consistent and negative. In an attempt to deflect the criticism, she self-deprecatingly donned a baglady costume at the 1982 Gridiron Dinner and sang "Second-Hand Clothes", mimicking the song "Second-Hand Rose". The skit helped to restore her reputation.

Reagan reflected on the criticisms in her 1989 autobiography, My Turn. She described lunching with former Democratic National Committee chairman Robert S. Strauss, wherein Strauss said to her, "When you first came to town, Nancy, I didn't like you at all. But after I got to know you, I changed my mind and said, 'She's some broad!'" Reagan responded, "Bob, based on the press reports I read then, I wouldn't have liked me either!"

After the presidency of Jimmy Carter (who dramatically reduced the formality of presidential functions), Reagan brought a Kennedy-esque glamour back into the White House. She hosted 56 state dinners over eight years. She remarked that hosting the dinners is "the easiest thing in the world. You don't have to do anything. Just have a good time and do a little business. And that's the way Washington works." The White House residence staff found Reagan demanding to work for during the preparation for the state dinners, with the first lady overseeing every aspect of meal presentations, and sometimes requesting one dessert after another be prepared, before finally settling on one she approved of.

In general, the first lady's desire for everything to appear just right in the White House led the residence staff to consider her not easy to work for, with tirades following what she perceived as mistakes. One staffer later recalled, "I remember hearing her call for her personal maid one day and it scared the dickens out of me—just her tone. I never wanted to be on the wrong side of her." She did show loyalty and respect to a number of the staff. In particular, she came to the public defense of a maid who was indicted on charges of helping to smuggle ammunition to Paraguay, providing an affidavit to the maid's good character (even though it was politically inopportune to do so at the time of the Iran–Contra affair); charges were subsequently dropped, and the maid returned to work at the White House.

In 1987, Mikhail Gorbachev became the first Soviet leader to visit Washington, D.C. since Nikita Khrushchev made the trip in 1959 at the height of the Cold War. Nancy was in charge of planning and hosting the important and highly anticipated state dinner, with the goal to impress both the Soviet leader and especially his wife Raisa Gorbacheva. After the meal, she recruited pianist Van Cliburn to play a rendition of "Moscow Nights" for the Soviet delegation, to which Mikhail and Raisa broke out into song. Secretary of State George P. Shultz later commented on the evening, saying "We felt the ice of the Cold War crumbling." Reagan concluded, "It was a perfect ending for one of the great evenings of my husband's presidency."

Just Say No 

The first lady launched the "Just Say No" drug awareness campaign in 1982, which was her primary project and major initiative as first lady. Reagan first became aware of the need to educate young people about drugs during a 1980 campaign stop in Daytop village, New York. She remarked in 1981 that "Understanding what drugs can do to your children, understanding peer pressure and understanding why they turn to drugs is ... the first step in solving the problem." Her campaign focused on drug education and informing the youth of the danger of drug abuse.

In 1982, Reagan was asked by a schoolgirl what to do when offered drugs; Reagan responded: "Just say no." The phrase proliferated in the popular culture of the 1980s, and was eventually adopted as the name of club organizations and school anti-drug programs. Reagan became actively involved by traveling more than  throughout the United States and several nations, visiting drug abuse prevention programs and drug rehabilitation centers. She also appeared on television talk shows, recorded public service announcements, and wrote guest articles. She appeared in an episode of the  sitcom Diff'rent Strokes to underscore support for the "Just Say No" campaign, and in a rock music video, "Stop the Madness" (1985).

In 1985, Reagan expanded the campaign to an international level by inviting the First Ladies of various nations to the White House for a conference on drug abuse. On October 27, 1986, President Reagan signed a drug enforcement bill into law, which granted $1.7 billion in funding to fight the perceived crisis and ensured a mandatory minimum penalty for drug offenses. Although the bill was criticized, Reagan considered it a personal victory. In 1988, she became the first active first lady invited to address the United Nations General Assembly, where she spoke on international drug interdiction and trafficking laws.

Critics of Reagan's efforts questioned their purpose, labelled Reagan's approach to promoting drug awareness as simplistic, and argued that the program did not give adequate attention to various social issues associated with increased rates of drug use, including unemployment, poverty, and family dissolution.

Her husband's protector 
Reagan assumed the role of unofficial "protector" for her husband after the attempted assassination of him in 1981. On March 30 of that year, President Reagan and three others were shot by the attempted assassin 25-year old John Hinckley, Jr as they left the Washington Hilton hotel. Nancy was alerted and arrived at George Washington University Hospital, where the President was hospitalized. She recalled having seen "emergency rooms before, but I had never seen one like this – with my husband in it." She was escorted into a waiting room, and when granted access to see her husband, he quipped to her, "Honey, I forgot to duck", borrowing the defeated boxer Jack Dempsey's jest to his wife.

An early example of the first lady's protective nature occurred when Senator Strom Thurmond entered the President's hospital room that day in March, passing the Secret Service detail by claiming he was the President's "close friend", presumably to acquire media attention. Nancy was outraged and demanded he leave. While the President recuperated in the hospital, the first lady slept with one of his shirts to be comforted by the scent. When Ronald Reagan was released from the hospital on April 12, she escorted him back to the White House.

Press accounts framed Reagan as her husband's "chief protector", an extension of their general initial framing of her as a helpmate and a Cold War domestic ideal. As it happened, the day after her husband was shot, Reagan fell off a chair while trying to take down a picture to bring to him in the hospital; she suffered several broken ribs, but was determined to not reveal it publicly.

Astrological consultations 

During the Reagan administration, Nancy Reagan consulted a San Francisco astrologer, Joan Quigley, who provided advice on which days and times would be optimal for the president's safety and success.  Quigley began her work at the White House after the assassination attempt on President Reagan in 1981. Nancy Reagan was told by Merv Griffin that Quigley had predicted that day would be dangerous for President Reagan, causing her to become a regular astrological consultant for the administration. Quigley previously worked on the Reagan campaign prior to serving as their astrological consultant. She volunteered for their campaign in 1980, as she was impressed by his astrological chart. Private lines were set up in the White House and Camp David to assist in phone calls between Nancy Reagan and Joan Quigley, which occurred multiple times a day, and she was paid $3,000 a month for her work.

White House Chief of Staff Donald Regan grew frustrated with this regimen, which created friction between him and the first lady. This friction escalated with the revelation of the Iran–Contra affair, an administration scandal, in which the first lady felt Regan was damaging the president. She thought he should resign, and expressed this to her husband, although he did not share her view. Regan wanted President Reagan to address the Iran-Contra matter in early 1987 by means of a press conference, though the first lady refused to allow her husband to overexert himself due to a recent prostate surgery and astrological warnings. She became so angry with Regan that he hung up on her during a 1987 telephone conversation. According to the recollections of ABC News correspondent Sam Donaldson, when the President heard of this treatment, he demanded—and eventually received—Regan's resignation. Vice President George H. W. Bush is also reported to have suggested to her to have Regan fired.

In his 1988 memoir, For the Record: From Wall Street to Washington, Regan wrote the following about Nancy Reagan's consultations with an astrologer:

Donald Regan's memoir went on to cause political discourse, as well as scrutiny of the astrological community, as he exposed the "most closely guarded secret" of the Reagan administration. Although he did not know Quigley's name at the time, he wrote extensively on her role in the White House. Reagan further claimed that Quigley selected the date of the 1985 Geneva Summit. For her part, Quigley stated in 1998 that she had "'absolutely nothing'" to do with arranging the summit and added that others were "'overemphasizing'" her role; however, in 1990, she released a book in which she asserted that she was "in charge" of the President's scheduling during the Reagan administration.

Reagan acknowledged in her memoirs that she altered the President's schedule without his knowledge based on astrological advice, but argues that "no political decision was ever based [on astrology]". She added, "Astrology was simply one of the ways I coped with the fear I felt after my husband almost died ... Was astrology one of the reasons [further attempts did not occur]? I don't really believe it was, but I don't really believe it wasn't."

Influence in the White House 
Nancy Reagan wielded a powerful influence over President Reagan. 
In her memoirs, Reagan stated, "I felt panicky every time [Ronald Reagan] left the White House". Following the assassination attempt, she strictly controlled access to the president; occasionally, she even attempted to influence her husband's decision making.

Beginning in 1985, she strongly encouraged her husband to hold "summit" conferences with Soviet general secretary Mikhail Gorbachev, and suggested they form a personal relationship beforehand. Both Ronald Reagan and Gorbachev had developed a productive relationship through their summit negotiations. The relationship between Nancy Reagan and Raisa Gorbacheva was anything but the friendly, diplomatic one between their husbands; Reagan found Gorbacheva hard to converse with and their relationship was described as "frosty". The two women usually had tea and discussed differences between the USSR and the United States. Visiting the United States for the first time in 1987, Gorbacheva irked Reagan with lectures on subjects ranging from architecture to socialism, reportedly prompting the American president's wife to quip, "Who does that dame think she is?"

Press framing of Reagan changed from that of just helpmate and protector to someone with hidden power. As the image of her as a political interloper grew, she sought to explicitly deny that she was the power behind the throne. At the end of her time as First Lady, however, she said that her husband had not been well-served by his staff. She acknowledged her role in reaction in influencing him on personnel decisions, saying "In no way do I apologize for it." She wrote in her memoirs, "I don't think I was as bad, or as extreme in my power or my weakness, as I was depicted," but went on, "However the first lady fits in, she has a unique and important role to play in looking after her husband. And it's only natural that she'll let him know what she thinks. I always did that for Ronnie, and I always will."

Breast cancer 
In October 1987, a mammogram detected a lesion in Reagan's left breast and she was subsequently diagnosed with breast cancer. She chose to undergo a mastectomy rather than a lumpectomy, and the breast was removed on October 17, 1987. Ten days after the operation, her 99-year-old mother, Edith Luckett Davis, died in Phoenix, Arizona, leading Reagan to dub the period "a terrible month".

After the surgery, more women across the country had mammograms, which exemplified the influence that the first lady possessed.

Later life 
Though Reagan was a controversial first lady, 56 percent of Americans had a favorable opinion of her when her husband left office on January 20, 1989, with 18 percent having an unfavorable opinion, and the balance not giving an opinion. Compared to fellow First Ladies when their husbands left office, Reagan's approval was higher than those of Rosalynn Carter, Hillary Clinton and Melania Trump. However, she was less popular than Barbara Bush and Michelle Obama, and her disapproval rating was double that of Carter's.

Upon leaving the White House, the couple returned to California, where wealthy friends purchased them a home in the wealthy East Gate Old Bel Air neighborhood of Bel Air, Los Angeles, dividing their time between Bel Air and the Reagan Ranch in Santa Barbara, California. Ronald and Nancy regularly attended the Bel Air Church as well. After leaving Washington, Reagan made numerous public appearances, many on behalf of her husband. She continued to reside at the Bel Air home, where she lived with her husband until he died on June 5, 2004.

Early post–White House activities 
In late 1989, the former first lady established the Nancy Reagan Foundation, which aimed to continue to educate people about the dangers of substance abuse. The Foundation teamed with the BEST Foundation For A Drug-Free Tomorrow in 1994, and developed the Nancy Reagan Afterschool Program. She continued to travel around the United States, speaking out against drug and alcohol abuse.

Her memoirs, My Turn: The Memoirs of Nancy Reagan (1989), are an account of her life in the White House, commenting openly about her influence within the Reagan administration, and discussing the myths and controversies that surrounded the couple. In 1991, the author Kitty Kelley wrote an unauthorized and largely uncited biography about Reagan, repeating accounts of a poor relationship with her children, and introducing rumors of alleged sexual relations with singer Frank Sinatra. A wide range of sources commented that Kelley's largely unsupported claims are most likely false.

In 1989, the IRS (Internal Revenue Service) began investigating the Reagans over allegations they owed additional tax on the gifts and loans of high-fashion clothes and jewellery to the first lady during their time in the White House (recipients benefiting from the display of such items recognize taxable income even if they are returned). In 1992, the IRS determined the Reagans had failed to include some $3 million worth of fashion items between 1983 and 1988 on their tax returns; they were billed for a large amount of back taxes and interest, which was subsequently paid.

After President Reagan revealed that he had been diagnosed with Alzheimer's disease in 1994, she made herself his primary caregiver, and became actively involved with the National Alzheimer's Association and its affiliate, the Ronald and Nancy Reagan Research Institute in Chicago, Illinois.

In April 1997, Nancy Reagan joined President Bill Clinton and former Presidents Ford and Bush in signing the Summit Declaration of Commitment in advocating for participation by private citizens in solving domestic issues within the United States.

Nancy Reagan was awarded the Presidential Medal of Freedom, the nation's highest civilian honor, by President George W. Bush on July 9, 2002. President Reagan received his own Presidential Medal of Freedom in January 1993. Reagan and her husband were jointly awarded the Congressional Gold Medal on May 16, 2002, at the United States Capitol building, and were only the third president and first lady to receive it; she accepted the medal on behalf of both of them.

Funeral for President Reagan 

Ronald Reagan died in their Bel Air home on June 5, 2004. During the seven-day state funeral, Nancy, accompanied by her children and military escort, led the nation in mourning. She kept a strong composure, traveling from her home to the Reagan Library for a memorial service, then to Washington, D.C., where her husband's body lay in state for 34 hours prior to a national funeral service in the Washington National Cathedral. She returned to the library in Simi Valley for a sunset memorial service and interment, where, overcome with emotion, she lost her composure and cried in public for the first time during the week. After receiving the folded flag, she kissed the casket and mouthed "I love you" before leaving. During the week, CNN journalist Wolf Blitzer said, "She's a very, very strong woman, even though she looks frail."

She had directed the detailed planning of the funeral, which included scheduling all the major events and asking former President George H. W. Bush, as well as former British Prime Minister Margaret Thatcher, former Soviet Union Leader Mikhail Gorbachev, and former Canadian Prime Minister Brian Mulroney to speak during the National Cathedral Service. She paid very close attention to the details, something she had always done in her husband's life. Betsy Bloomingdale, one of Reagan's closest friends, stated, "She looks a little frail. But she is very strong inside. She is. She has the strength. She is doing her last thing for Ronnie. And she is going to get it right." The funeral marked her first major public appearance since she delivered a speech to the 1996 Republican National Convention on her husband's behalf.

The funeral had a great impact on her public image. Following substantial criticism during her tenure as first lady, she was seen somewhat as a national heroine, praised by many for supporting and caring for her husband while he suffered from Alzheimer's disease. U.S. News & World Report opined, "after a decade in the shadows, a different, softer Nancy Reagan emerged."

Widowhood 
Following her husband's death, Reagan remained active in politics, particularly relating to stem cell research. Beginning in 2004, she favored what many consider to be the Democratic Party's position, and urged President George W. Bush to support federally funded embryonic stem cell research, in the hope that this science could lead to a cure for Alzheimer's disease. Although she failed to change the president's position, she did support his campaign for a second term.

In 2005, Reagan was honored at a gala dinner at the Ronald Reagan Building in Washington, D.C., where guests included Dick Cheney, Harry Reid, and Condoleezza Rice.

In 2007, she attended the national funeral service for Gerald Ford in the Washington National Cathedral. Reagan hosted two 2008 Republican presidential debates at the Reagan Presidential Library, the first in May 2007 and the second in January 2008. On March 25, she formally endorsed Senator John McCain, then the presumptive Republican party nominee for president, but McCain would go on to lose the election to Barack Obama.

Reagan attended the funeral of Lady Bird Johnson in Austin, Texas, on July 14, 2007, and three days later accepted the highest Polish distinction, the Order of the White Eagle, on behalf of Ronald Reagan at the Reagan Library. The Reagan Library opened the temporary exhibit "Nancy Reagan: A First Lady's Style", which displayed over eighty designer dresses belonging to her.

Reagan's health and well-being became a prominent concern in 2008. In February, she suffered a fall at her Bel Air home and was taken to Saint John's Health Center in Santa Monica, California. Doctors reported that she did not break her hip as feared, and she was released from the hospital two days later. News commentators noted that Reagan's step had slowed significantly, as the following month she walked in very slow strides with John McCain.

In October 2008, Reagan was admitted to Ronald Reagan UCLA Medical Center after falling at home. Doctors determined that the 87-year-old had fractured her pelvis and sacrum, and could recuperate at home with a regimen of physical therapy. As a result of her mishap, medical articles were published containing information on how to prevent falls. In January 2009, Reagan was said to be "improving every day and starting to get out more and more".

In March 2009, she praised President Barack Obama for reversing the ban on federally funded embryonic stem cell research. She traveled to Washington, D.C. in June 2009 to unveil a statue of her late husband in the Capitol rotunda. She was also on hand as President Obama signed the Ronald Reagan Centennial Commission Act, and lunched privately with Michelle Obama. Reagan revealed in an interview with Vanity Fair that Michelle Obama had telephoned her for advice on living and entertaining in the White House. Following the death of Senator Ted Kennedy in August 2009, she said she was "terribly saddened ... Given our political differences, people are sometimes surprised how close Ronnie and I have been to the Kennedy family ... I will miss him." She attended the funeral of Betty Ford in Rancho Mirage, California, on July 12, 2011.

Reagan hosted a 2012 Republican presidential debate at the Reagan Presidential Library on September 7, 2011. She suffered a fall in March 2012. Two months later, she endured several broken ribs, which prevented her from attending a speech given by Paul Ryan in the Reagan Presidential Library in May 2012. She endorsed Republican presidential candidate Mitt Romney on May 31, 2012, explaining that her husband would have liked Romney's business background and what she called "strong principles". Following the death of former British Prime Minister Margaret Thatcher in April 2013, she stated, "The world has lost a true champion of freedom and democracy ... Ronnie and I knew her as a dear and trusted friend, and I will miss her."

Death and funeral 
On March 6, 2016, Nancy Reagan died of congestive heart failure at her home in Los Angeles at the age of 94. On March 7, President Barack Obama issued a presidential proclamation ordering the flag of the United States to be flown at half-staff until sunset on the day of Reagan's interment.
 
Her funeral was held on March 11 at the Ronald Reagan Presidential Library in Simi Valley, California. Representatives from ten first families were in attendance, including former president George W. Bush and first ladies Michelle Obama, Laura Bush, Hillary Clinton, and Rosalynn Carter. The other representatives were presidential children Steven Ford, Tricia Nixon Cox, Luci Baines Johnson, and Caroline Kennedy, and presidential grandchild Anne Eisenhower Flottl.

Other prominent individuals in attendance included California governor Jerry Brown and former governors Arnold Schwarzenegger and Pete Wilson,  then-former House speaker Nancy Pelosi and former House speaker Newt Gingrich, and former members of the Reagan administration, including George P. Shultz and Edwin Meese. A sizable contingent from the Hollywood entertainment industry attended as well, including Mr. T, Maria Shriver (Schwarzenegger's then-wife), Wayne Newton, Johnny Mathis, Anjelica Huston, John Stamos, Tom Selleck, Bo Derek, and Melissa Rivers.  In all there were some 1,000 guests.

Eulogies were given by former prime minister of Canada Brian Mulroney, former secretary of state James Baker, Diane Sawyer, Tom Brokaw, and her children Patti Davis and Ron Reagan. After the funeral, Nancy Reagan was interred next to her husband.

Historical assessments 
Since 1982 Siena College Research Institute has conducted occasional surveys asking historians to assess American first ladies according to a cumulative score on the independent criteria of their background, value to the country, intelligence, courage, accomplishments, integrity, leadership, being their own women, public image, and value to the president. In terms of cumulative assessment Reagan has been ranked:
39th-best of 42 in 1982
36th-best of 37 in 1993
28th-best of 38 in 2003
15th-best of 38 in 2008
15th-best of 39 in 2014

In the 1993 Sienna Research Institute survey, the first conducted after Reagan left the White House, Reagan was assessed very poorly by historians, ranking the second-worst, with only Mary Todd Lincoln being given a worse assessment. Reagan was ranked the lowest in half of the criteria (background, value to the country, intelligence, courage, and integrity). Regard for Reagan has improved in subsequent iterations of the survey. In the 2008 Siena Research Institute survey, Reagan was ranked the 4th-highest in value to the president, but was ranked the lowest in integrity. In the 2003 survey, Reagan ranked the 5th-highest in value to the president. In the 2014 survey, Reagan and her husband were ranked the 16th-highest out of 39 first couples in terms of being a "power couple". In the 2014 survey, historians ranked Reagan among 20th and 21st century American first ladies as being the 5th greatest in terms of being a "political asset" and 5th greatest in terms of being a strong public communicator.

Reagan and her husband have each posthumously experienced continued criticism for having, during their time in the White House, spent years publicly ignoring the HIV/AIDS epidemic, which began during her husband's presidency. The epidemic had initially predominantly impacted the male homosexual community. Reagan's great extended public silence on this matter has been contrasted with her coinciding vocalness against drug use. Reagan's extended failure to give significant public acknowledgement of this epidemic has been seen as one of the greatest detractions in her retrospective public regard. However, there has been reporting to suggest that, privately, Reagan did unsuccessfully urge her husband's administration to address the epidemic.

Awards and honors 

As noted earlier, Nancy Reagan was awarded the Presidential Medal of Freedom in 2002 and the Congressional Gold Medal, in the same year. 
In 1989, she received the Council of Fashion Designers of America's lifetime achievement award.

As First Lady, Nancy Reagan received an Honorary Doctorate of Laws degree from Pepperdine University in 1983.
Later, she received an Honorary Doctor of Humane Letters degree from Eureka College in Illinois, her husband's alma mater, in 2009.

Filmography 

 The Crippler  (1940) (Short)
 Portrait of Jennie (1948)
 The Doctor and the Girl (1949)
 East Side, West Side (1949)
 Shadow on the Wall (1950)
 The Next Voice You Hear... (1950)
 Night into Morning (1951)
 It's a Big Country (1951)
 Talk About a Stranger (1952)
 Shadow in the Sky (1952)
 Donovan's Brain (1953)
 The Dark Wave (1956) (Short)
 Hellcats of the Navy (1957)
 Crash Landing (1958)

As Nancy Davis, she also made a number of television appearances from 1953 to 1962, as a guest star in dramatic shows or installments of anthology series. These included Ford Television Theatre (her first appearance with Ronald Reagan came during a 1953 episode titled "First Born"), Schlitz Playhouse of Stars, Dick Powell's Zane Grey Theatre (appearing with Ronald Reagan in the 1961 episode "The Long Shadow"), Wagon Train, The Tall Man, and General Electric Theater (hosted by Ronald Reagan).

References

Further reading

 
 
 
 
 
 
 
 
 Gale Literature. "Nancy Reagan." in Gale Literature: Contemporary Authors (Gale, 2016) online
 
 
 Leamer, Laurence. Make-Believe: The Story of Nancy and Ronald Reagan (Harper, 1983).
 
 
 
 Nyberg, Ferdinand. "Nancy Reagan in the ghetto. On space as mediator between structure and event." InterDisciplines. Journal of History and Sociology 7.2 (2016). online
 
  H. W. Brands Reagan: The Life (2015) p. 743 says "she wrote one of the most candid and at times self-critical memoirs in recent American political history."
 
 
 Roberts, Jason. "Nancy Reagan." in  Katherine A.S. Sibley, ed., A Companion to First Ladies (2016): 585–603.

External links

 First Lady profile at WhiteHouse.gov
 Profile at the Ronald Reagan Presidential Library
 
 Nancy Reagan at C-SPAN's First Ladies: Influence & Image
 First Ladies of California
 
 
 
 
 

|-

 
1921 births
2016 deaths
Nancy
First ladies of the United States
First Ladies and Gentlemen of California
People from Washington Heights, Manhattan
People from Flushing, Queens
People from Bethesda, Maryland
Actresses from New York City
Actresses from Chicago
American adoptees
American people of English descent
American autobiographers
American film actresses
Bolling family of Virginia
California Republicans
Members of the Junior League
Metro-Goldwyn-Mayer contract players
Smith College alumni
Latin School of Chicago alumni
Congressional Gold Medal recipients
Presidential Medal of Freedom recipients
Right-wing politics in the United States
Deaths from congestive heart failure
Burials in Ventura County, California
20th-century American actresses
21st-century American women
Age controversies